Paul Franklin Dano (born June 19, 1984) is an American actor and musician. He began his career on Broadway. He won the Independent Spirit Award for Best Debut Performance for his role in L.I.E. (2001) and gained wider recognition for playing a troubled teenager in Little Miss Sunshine (2006). For playing identical twins in Paul Thomas Anderson's period drama There Will Be Blood (2007), he was nominated for the BAFTA Award for Best Supporting Actor.

Dano's profile continued to expand with acclaimed roles in 12 Years a Slave and Prisoners (both 2013), and for portraying Beach Boys founder Brian Wilson in Love & Mercy (2014), for which he earned a Golden Globe nomination for Best Supporting Actor. He played The Riddler in The Batman and a caring father in The Fabelmans (both 2022), receiving a Screen Actors Guild Award nomination for the latter.

Dano made his directorial debut with the drama film Wildlife (2018), based on the novel by Richard Ford; he co-wrote its screenplay with his wife Zoe Kazan. Also in 2018, he starred as a convicted murderer in the Showtime miniseries Escape at Dannemora, for which he received a Primetime Emmy Award nomination for Outstanding Supporting Actor.

Early life
Dano was born in New York City, New York, the son of Gladys (née Pipp), a homemaker, and Paul A. Dano, a financial advisor. He has a younger sister named Sarah. Dano spent the first few years of his childhood in New York City and initially attended the Browning School. While he was a child, Dano's family moved to New Canaan, Connecticut, finally settling in Wilton, Connecticut. Dano continued his education at Wilton High School, graduating in 2002 and attending Eugene Lang College in New York City. He was involved in community theater, and while he was performing in New Canaan, his parents were encouraged to take him to New York.

Career

2000s

Dano made his Broadway debut at age twelve in John Tillinger's revival of Inherit the Wind alongside George C. Scott and Charles Durning. He appeared in an episode of the sitcom Smart Guy and had a minor role in the 2000 family drama The Newcomers. He played the part of Patrick Whalen in several episodes of The Sopranos (season 4).

Dano acted in his first major film role when he was sixteen, playing Howie Blitzer, a teenage boy who becomes involved with a middle-aged ephebophile (Brian Cox) in L.I.E. (2001). He then appeared in the television film Too Young to Be a Dad as a high school student whose life is disrupted when his girlfriend becomes pregnant. He appeared in The Emperor's Club in 2002 as Martin Blythe. In 2004, he played a small role as young Martin Asher in Taking Lives with Angelina Jolie and Ethan Hawke. Additionally, Dano starred in the sleeper hit The Girl Next Door, alongside Elisha Cuthbert, Emile Hirsch, and Chris Marquette. In 2005, he played supporting roles in The King and The Ballad of Jack and Rose.

He came to greater attention in 2006, when he played Dwayne, a voluntarily mute teenager as part of an ensemble in the comedic drama Little Miss Sunshine, which received critical acclaim and collective awards for its cast. He also had a supporting role in the 2006 film Fast Food Nation, based on the nonfiction book by Eric Schlosser. Dano had a dual role for the 2007 period film There Will Be Blood, which earned him positive reviews and a BAFTA nomination for Best Supporting Actor. Texas Monthly said that his performance was "so electric that the movie sags whenever he's not around." Peter Travers remarked "All praise to the baby-faced Dano...for bringing sly cunning and unexpected ferocity to Plainview's most formidable opponent." Rolling Stone magazine included Dano in its Hot List for 2007, calling his performance style "Daniel Day-Lewis + Billy Crudup × Johnny Depp."

Dano appeared in several additional Broadway productions including A Thousand Clowns at the Roundabout Theatre, and in the Ethan Hawke directorial debut Things We Want during its 2007 Off-Broadway run.

In 2008, he starred in Gigantic, a poorly-reviewed film about a man seeking to adopt a Chinese baby, co-starring Zooey Deschanel. He reunited with Brian Cox in 2009's Good Heart, a low-budget English-language Icelandic film. He provided the voice of one of the creatures in the film adaptation of Where the Wild Things Are (2009).

2010s
He played a genius inventor in 2010's Knight and Day, an action thriller starring Tom Cruise and Cameron Diaz. The same year, he appeared in Meek's Cutoff, a well-reviewed historical drama. In 2011, he had a supporting role in the big-budget science fiction film Cowboys and Aliens.

Dano appeared in three feature films in 2012: Ruby Sparks, as a writer whose fictional character (played by Zoe Kazan, the film's writer and Dano's partner) inexplicably appears as a real person; time-travel thriller Looper, in a supporting role with Joseph Gordon-Levitt and Bruce Willis; and with Robert De Niro in Being Flynn as the film's writer Nick Flynn, about his relationship with his father. In 2013, Dano appeared in Steve McQueen's period drama biopic 12 Years a Slave, based on the memoirs of Solomon Northup. Dano portrayed John Tibeats, an overseer at the plantation Northup is sold to. The film was a massive critical success and won the Academy Award for Best Picture, among numerous other awards.

In 2014, Dano played a younger version of the Beach Boys founder Brian Wilson, with John Cusack as an older version of Wilson, in the biopic Love & Mercy, for which he received a Golden Globe Award nomination for Best Supporting Actor.

In 2015, Dano appeared with Michael Caine and Harvey Keitel in the Italian comedy-drama Youth; Dano portrayed Jimmy Tree, an actor who is researching for an upcoming role but is frustrated that he is best-remembered by the public for a prior role as a robot. In January 2016, Dano appeared as Pierre Bezukhov in the BBC's six-part adaptation of Tolstoy's War and Peace.

In fall 2016, he appeared in video as an onstage "stand-in" during the Nostalgic for the Present concert tour of Australian singer Sia, for her song "Bird Set Free."

In July 2016, it was announced that Dano would make his directorial debut with the movie Wildlife, based on the 1990 novel of the same name, by Richard Ford. The movie would be produced by June Pictures, and would star Carey Mulligan and Jake Gyllenhaal. Dano stated, "I have always wanted to make films and have always known I would make films about family. I couldn't be happier to have such beautiful collaborators like Carey and Jake leading the way." The film received critical acclaim upon its premiere at the Sundance Film Festival. It also screened at the Cannes Film Festival, the Toronto Film Festival and the Mill Valley Film Festival. The film has earned a 94% on Rotten Tomatoes with the consensus reading, "Wildlife's portrait of a family in crisis is beautifully composed by director Paul Dano -- and brought brilliantly to life by a career-best performance from Carey Mulligan".

In 2016, Dano played the role of Hank Thompson in Daniel Scheinert and Daniel Kwan's absurdist black comedy film Swiss Army Man, alongside Daniel Radcliffe and Mary Elizabeth Winstead. His character is a suicidal man stranded on an island, who befriends a farting corpse. The film premiered at the Sundance Film Festival on January 22, and opened in theaters on June 24. Although some viewers walked out of the film viewing due to its bizarre humor, critics left generally favorable reviews of the film. Paul won the Critics' Choice Award twice in 2007, and was nominated in 2014 and 2016.

In 2018, he portrayed escaped inmate David Sweat in the Showtime miniseries Escape at Dannemora alongside Patricia Arquette and Benicio del Toro, for which he received a nomination for the Primetime Emmy Award for Outstanding Supporting Actor in a Limited Series.

From December 27, 2018 to March 17, 2019, Dano starred in the critically acclaimed Broadway revival of Sam Shepard's True West with Ethan Hawke at the Roundabout Theater Company's American Airlines Theater in New York.

In October 2019, Dano was cast as The Riddler in Matt Reeves's 2022 superhero film The Batman. Reeves wrote the role with Dano in mind after seeing Dano's portrayal of Brian Wilson in Love & Mercy.

2020s 
In April 2021, Paul Dano was cast in Steven Spielberg's semi-autobiographical coming-of-age film The Fabelmans as Burt Fabelman, a character loosely based on Spielberg's father Arnold. The film was released in 2022 to universal acclaim; with Dano's performance earning praise from Pete Hammond of Deadline Hollywood acclaiming him as "terrific as the genuinely nice and loving father torn between following his own career and caring for his wife and family under increasingly difficult circumstances" and Stephanie Zacharek of Time including Dano in Time's Top 10 movie performances of 2022 describing his portrayal as "the sum of all the things that so many men of that generation just didn't know how to be; we also see a deep well of love, no less real for being left unexpressed." Dano would subsequently receive nominations for Best Supporting Actor at the Screen Actors Guild Awards and Critics' Choice Movie Awards.

Also in April 2021, he joined Adam Sandler and Carey Mulligan in Netflix's Spaceman, an adaptation of Jaroslav Kalfař's novel Spaceman of Bohemia, directed by Johan Renck. He is also set to star in AMC's animated drama Pantheon, and in a television series based on Mr. and Mrs. Smith for Amazon Prime Video, joining Donald Glover, Maya Erskine, Michaela Coel and John Torturro. In September 2022, it was announced that Dano would star in Craig Gillespie's Dumb Money, an adaptation of Ben Mezrich's The Antisocial Network, alongside Seth Rogen, Sebastian Stan and Pete Davidson.

In March 2022, it was announced that Dano would make his comic debut writing The Riddler: Year One for DC's Black Label imprint. The six issue limited series is set in the continuity of The Batman and showcase Nashton's rise to becoming the Riddler.

Personal life
Dano has been in a relationship with actress and screenwriter Zoe Kazan since 2007. They have a daughter, born in August 2018, and a son, born in October 2022. They reside in Boerum Hill, Brooklyn.

Dano is the vocalist and lead guitarist of the band Mook.

Bibliography 
 The Riddler: Year One (2022–2023)

Filmography

Film

As an actor

Television

Theatre

Discography 
With Mook

 The Eggs EP (2007)
 Mook (2011)

Awards and nominations

References

External links
 
 Paul Dano at The Good Heart Press Day

1984 births
20th-century American male actors
21st-century American male actors
American male child actors
American male stage actors
American male film actors
American male television actors
Browning School alumni
Living people
Male actors from Connecticut
Male actors from New York City
Kazan family
Outstanding Performance by a Cast in a Motion Picture Screen Actors Guild Award winners
Pace University alumni
People from Manhattan
People from Wilton, Connecticut
People from New Canaan, Connecticut
People from Boerum Hill, Brooklyn
Wilton High School alumni